Watson is an unincorporated community in Clayton County, Iowa, United States. The county seat of Elkader lies approximately 15 miles to the southwest.

History
Watson's population was 25 in 1902, and 27 in 1925.

References

Unincorporated communities in Clayton County, Iowa
Unincorporated communities in Iowa